Khaybar or Khaibar may refer to:

Khaybar, an oasis in Medina Province, Saudi Arabia
Khaibar (Hunza), a village in Gilgit−Baltistan, Pakistan
 Khaibar-1, a Syrian-made rocket widely used in the 2006 Lebanon War by Hezbollah against Israel
 KH-2002 Khaybar, an Iranian bullpup assault rifle
PNS Khaibar (1956), a British Battle-class destroyer of the Pakistan Navy sunk by Indian forces during the Bangladesh Liberation War in 1971
PNS Khaibar (1989), an American guided-missile frigate in service with the Pakistan Navy from 1989 to 1993
PNS Khaibar (1994), a British destroyer acquired by the Pakistan Navy in 1994 and designated as a Tariq-class warship

See also
 Battle of Khaybar, a military engagement between the early Muslims and the Khaybar Jews in 628 CE
 Ka-Bar, a combat knife first used by the United States military in 1942
 Khyber (disambiguation), a similar-sounding alternative spelling for other entities